Balta Sound is a sound (inlet) on the east coast of the island of Unst in the Shetland Islands, Scotland.  The sound is sheltered from the North Sea to the east by the uninhabited island of Balta.

The settlement at the west of the sound is Baltasound.

On 12 March 1917, the World War I British E-class submarine  was heading out of Balta Sound on patrol when it struck a naval mine laid by German U-boat .  It was sunk in the channel between the islands of Huney and Balta with the loss of the entire crew. The site of the wreck is now designated as a war grave.

Sounds of Scotland
Landforms of Shetland
Unst